The 1992 Consensus is a political term referring to the alleged outcome of a meeting in 1992 between the semiofficial representatives of the People's Republic of China (PRC) of mainland China and the Republic of China (ROC) of Taiwan.  They are often credited as creating a diplomatic basis for semi-official cross-strait exchanges which began in the early 1990s and is a precondition set by the PRC for engaging in cross-strait dialogue.

Whether the meetings truly resulted in a consensus is under dispute in the ROC. The Kuomintang (KMT) understanding of the consensus is "one China, different interpretations" (一中各表, 一個中國各自表述), i.e. that the ROC and PRC agree that there is one China, but disagree about what "China" means (i.e. ROC vs. PRC).  The PRC's position is that there is one China (including Taiwan), of which PRC is the sole legitimate representative.  This discrepancy has been criticized by Taiwan's Democratic Progressive Party that is now in power, and by others.

Critics have also pointed out that the term was not created contemporaneously within the timeframe of the meeting: the term was coined in April 2000 by former National Security Council secretary-general Su Chi, eight years after the 1992 meetings.  The President of ROC in 1992, Lee Teng-hui, denied the existence of the 1992 Consensus in 2006. The 1992 Consensus was rejected by the current leader of Taiwan, Tsai Ing-wen, who associated it with one country, two systems in a 2019 speech.

History

1992 ARATS-SEF meeting and Wang-Koo summits 

In November 1992, a meeting occurred between the Association for Relations Across the Taiwan Strait (ARATS) of the People's Republic of China (PRC) and the Straits Exchange Foundation (SEF) of the Republic of China (ROC) in British Hong Kong.  Three months before the meeting on 1 August 1992, the Mainland Affairs Council of the ROC published the following statement regarding the meaning of "One China": (later adopted by the now defunct National Unification Council):

"Both sides of the Taiwan Strait agree that there is only one China. However, the two sides of the Strait have different opinions as to the meaning of 'one China.' To Peking, 'one China' means the 'People’s Republic of China (PRC),' with Taiwan to become a 'Special Administration Region' after unification. Taipei, on the other hand, considers 'one China' to mean the Republic of China (ROC), founded in 1911 and with de jure sovereignty over all of China. The ROC, however, currently has jurisdiction only over Taiwan, Penghu, Kinmen, and Matsu. Taiwan is part of China, and the Chinese mainland is part of China as well."

Following the meeting, the SEF issued the following statement:

"On November 3 [1992], a responsible person of the Communist Chinese ARATS said that it is willing to 'respect and accept' SEF’s proposal that each side 'verbally states' its respective principles on 'one China.'"

The ARATS issued the following statement:
 "At this working-level consultation in Hong Kong, SEF representatives suggested that each side use respective verbal announcements to state the one China principle. On November 3, SEF sent a letter, formally notifying that "each side will make respective statements through verbal announcements." ARATS fully respects and accepts SEF's suggestion."

The conclusion they reached was intended as a means of side-stepping the conflict over the political status of Taiwan. At the time of the meeting, Hong Kong was under British rule and therefore considered neutral territory by both sides.

As a result of the 1992 meeting, ARATS Chairman Wang Daohan and SEF Chairman Koo Chen-fu met in Singapore on April 27, 1993, in what became known as the "Wang-Koo summit". They concluded agreements on document authentication, postal transfers, and a schedule for future ARATS-SEF meetings.  Talks were delayed as tensions rose in the Third Taiwan Strait Crisis, but in October 1998 a second round of Wang-Koo summit were held in Shanghai. Wang and Koo agreed to meet again in Taiwan in the autumn of 1999, but the meeting was called off by the PRC side when then President Lee Teng-hui proposed his 'Two-states Theory' whereby each side would treat the other as separate state, which was not considered acceptable to the PRC.

Chen Shui-bian era

The election of the DPP to the ROC government in 2000 prompted former SEF official Su Chi to coin the term "1992 Consensus" as an ambiguous replacement for the previous terms in order to capture the broadest consensus between the different parties over the outcome of the 1992 meeting. President Chen Shui-bian initially expressed some willingness to accept the 1992 Consensus, a precondition set by the PRC for dialogue, but backed down after backlash within his own party.

In a speech on 10 October 2004, then-president Chen Shui-bian expressed his willingness to initiate dialogue with PRC leaders on "the basis of the 1992 meeting in Hong Kong." This formulation did not imply that an agreement on one China was made in the 1992 meeting; thus, Chen's speech was widely seen as an effort to establish a basis for negotiations with the PRC without accepting the one China principle. The PRC did not respond to his speech favorably; thus, subsequently, no dialogs were initiated.

The 1992 Consensus was invoked again the following year, when KMT chairman Lien Chan and People First Party (PFP) chairman James Soong made separate trips to Mainland China to begin party-to-party dialog both between the CCP and KMT and between the CCP and PFP. Both leaders explicitly endorsed the 1992 Consensus.

During debates in the 2008 Taiwanese presidential election between KMT candidate Ma Ying-jeou and DPP candidate Frank Hsieh, Ma said the 1992 Consensus undoubtedly existed, and that while the DPP were entitled to disagree with it, they could not deny its existence. Furthermore, he stated that the agreements reached in the 2005 Pan-Blue visits to mainland China, which occurred on the basis of the 1992 Consensus, could, if it was beneficial to the people, be developed into policy and thence into law, and put into practice.

Ma Ying-jeou era

The election of the KMT to the ROC government saw both sides of the Taiwan strait moving closer to a common interpretation of the Consensus. In March, PRC's state news agency Xinhua in its English website reported a telephone discussion between US president George W. Bush and his PRC counterpart Hu Jintao. According to Chinese and American sources, Hu said that it is PRC's "consistent stand that the Chinese Mainland and Taiwan should restore consultation and talks on the basis of the 1992 Consensus, which sees both sides recognize there is only one China, but agree to differ on its definition". On the other hand, Xinhua's Chinese version of the report only stated that the resumption of the talks should be on the basis of the 1992 Consensus without expanding into the meaning of the Consensus.

In his inauguration speech on 20 May 2008, ROC president Ma Ying-jeou stated that in 1992 the two sides of the strait reached a consensus which saw "one China with different interpretations" and the ROC would resume talks with the PRC as soon as possible based on the 1992 Consensus.

On 28 May 2008, KMT Chairman Wu Po-hsiung met Hu Jintao as General Secretary of the Communist Party of China in Beijing at the CCP's invitation to engage in an intraparty dialog. In the meeting, the parties expressed that both sides across the strait will lay aside disputes, and work for a win-win situation on the basis of the 1992 Consensus. As well as the party-to-party channel, the semi-governmental dialog channel via the SEF and the ARATS was scheduled to re-open in June 2008 on the basis of the 1992 Consensus, with the first meeting held in Beijing. The first priority for the SEF-ARATS meeting would be the establishments of the three links, especially direct flights between mainland China and Taiwan. Weekend direct chartered flights between mainland China and Taiwan commenced on 4 July 2008 subsequent to the successful cross-strait talks in June 2008.

On 2 September 2008, the ROC President Ma Ying-jeou was interviewed by the Mexico-based newspaper El Sol de México. He was asked about his views on the subject of "two Chinas" and if there is a solution for the sovereignty issues between the two. The ROC President replied that the relations are neither between two Chinas nor two states. It is a special relationship. Further, he stated that the sovereignty issues between the two cannot be resolved at present, but he quoted the 1992 Consensus, currently accepted by both sides according to Ma, as a temporary measure until a solution becomes available. The spokesman for the ROC Presidential Office Wang Yu-chi later clarified the President's statement and said that the relations are between two regions of one country, based on the ROC Constitutional position, the Act Governing Relations between the People of the Taiwan Area and the Mainland Area and the 1992 Consensus.

On 12 January 2011, Xinhua news agency reiterated Beijing's position on this issue by defining the 1992 Consensus as saying that "under which both sides adhere to the One-China Principle".

The 1992 Consensus was stressed by both Ma and Xi during the 2015 Ma-Xi meeting.  During the meetings, Ma brought up the "different interpretations" of "one China".

Tsai Ing-wen era 

In her 2016 campaign, Tsai Ing-wen did not challenge the 1992 consensus, but did not explicitly accept it either, referring instead to "existing realities and political foundations".

On 2 January 2019, Chinese Communist Party general secretary Xi Jinping marked the 40th Anniversary message to Taiwan compatriots with a long speech calling for the adherence to the 1992 Consensus and vigorously opposing Taiwanese independence. He said the political resolution of the Taiwan issue will be the formula used in Hong Kong and Macau, the one country, two systems. The ROC President, Tsai Ing-wen responded to Xi's speech the same day. She stated that "the Beijing authorities' definition of the '1992 Consensus' is 'one China' and 'one country, two systems'", and that "we have never accepted the '1992 Consensus.'" Nevertheless, Tsai called for the PRC to conduct negotiations with the Taiwanese government to resolve the political status of Taiwan rather than engage in political consultations with Taiwanese political parties to advance their reunification goals. A January 2020 piece in The Diplomat noted that the CCP, KMT, and DPP were all currently challenging their own conceptions of the 1992 consensus. A task force convened by the Kuomintang's reform committee issued new guidelines on cross-strait relations in June 2020. The task force found that public trust in the consensus had declined due to the actions of the Democratic Progressive Party and Beijing. The consensus was described as "a historical description of past cross-strait interaction," and the task force proposed that the consensus be replaced with a commitment to "upholding the Republic of China’s national sovereignty; safeguarding freedom, democracy and human rights; prioritizing the safety of Taiwan; and creating win-win cross-strait relations."

Following the landslide defeat of the KMT in the 2020 Taiwanese presidential election, some commentators speculated that the KMT would remove the 1992 Consensus from the party platform due to its associations with "one country, two systems".  However, KMT chairman Johnny Chiang ultimately kept the 1992 Consensus.  However, he rejected the "one country, two systems" as a feasible model for Taiwan. In 2021, the Taiwan Affairs Office stated that the meaning of the 1992 consensus is "both sides of the strait belong to one China, and work together to strive for national unification".  The KMT platform under newly elected chairman Eric Chu also continued to include the 1992 consensus while rejecting "one country, two systems". In 2022 KMT chair Eric Chu called the 1992 Consensus a "'no consensus' consensus."

Debate surrounding the term 

The KMT has defined the 1992 Consensus as "one China with different interpretations", i.e. that both sides agreed that there was one China, but indirectly recognized and respected that both sides had different interpretations of that concept. By contrast, the PRC has consistently emphasized that the meaning of the 1992 Consensus is "one China".  

The Democratic Progressive Party (DPP), however, did not understand the 1992 meeting as reaching any consensus on there being only "one China". Instead, it saw the outcome of the meeting as establishing that the two sides had different interpretations of the status quo. In support of this view, they point out that both Hsu Huei-yu and Koo Chen-fu, who participated in the 1992 meeting as SEF delegates, have publicly affirmed that the meeting did not result in any consensus on the "one China" issue. Instead, they claim, both sides agreed to proceed with future meetings on the basis of equality and mutual respect. Koo stated in his biography that, "Both sides across the strait have different interpretations of the 1992 Hong Kong meeting.  Rather than using 'consensus,' the term of art should be 'understanding' or 'accord' to better reflect the fact, thus avoiding untruthful application."

The Chief of the ROC Mainland Affairs Council also indicated that no consensus was reached as a result of the 1992 meeting and that the term 1992 Consensus was only introduced by the mass media in 1995.  Some Taiwan independence supporters, such as former President Lee Teng-hui, point to a lack of documentation to argue that the consensus has never existed.

According to Raymond Burghardt, the chair of the American Institute in Taiwan, the United States representative office in Taiwan:
"[There was] some language [in the faxes] that overlapped and some language that differed." Then Taiwan and China agreed to conduct dialog based on their statements written in those faxes. "That's what happened. Nothing more or nothing less," Burghardt said, adding that the KMT called this the '1992 Consensus', which was to some extent "confusing and misleading. To me, I'm not sure why you could call that a consensus."

Public opinion in Taiwan 

In 2018, academics conducted a survey in Taiwan to assess Taiwanese understanding of the 1992 Consensus.  They gave respondents four possible meanings of the consensus:
 Historic: On international affairs, both ROC and PRC claim to represent the whole Chinese people including both mainland and Taiwan.
 KMT definition:  ROC represents Taiwan, PRC represents the mainland, the two governments belong to the same country waiting for unification.
 Incorrect: ROC represents Taiwan, PRC represents the mainland, the two governments belong to two different countries.
 PRC definition: PRC represents the whole Chinese people including both mainland and Taiwan, and ROC is the local government.

They found that 34% chose the KMT's definition (which was acceptable to 48%), 33% chose the incorrect definition (acceptable to 75%), 17% chose the historic relationship (acceptable to 40%), and 5% chose the PRC definition (acceptable to 10%), and 11% did not respond.

A 2020 poll conducted by the Duke University Program in Asian Security Studies that asked "Some people argue that Taiwan and China should live under a policy of “One China, Two Rule” with ongoing exchanges. Do you support this statement?" found that 51.0% of respondents agreed and 39.5% of respondents disagreed.

See also

 Cross-Strait relations
 One-China policy
 Taiwan consensus
 Act Governing Relations between the People of the Taiwan Area and the Mainland Area

References

Consensus
Cross-Strait relations
Consensus
1992 in Taiwan
2000 neologisms
Political compromises